Mary Bird Perkins Cancer Center is a cancer care organization with locations in Louisiana and Mississippi.

History 
In the late 1960s, community leaders headed by Dr. M.J. Rathbone, Jr. and Anna B. Lipsey saw the need for a community owned, nonprofit radiation cancer facility in the greater Baton Rouge area. With both the vision and financial support of the Baton Rouge community the Cancer Radiation and Research Foundation – now known as Mary Bird Perkins Cancer Center – was established.

In 1968, the Foundation held a capital campaign capped by a donation of land from philanthropist Paul D. Perkins, whom he made in honor of his late daughter, Mary Bird. In 1971, the Mary Bird Perkins Radiation Treatment Center opened its doors in Baton Rouge. After 14 years of operation, in 1985, Mary Bird Perkins relocated to its present site on Essen Lane and installed the first linear accelerator in the state. The following year, in 1986, the name of the center was changed to Mary Bird Perkins Cancer Center.

In 1988, the first satellite treatment center was opened in Hammond, followed by six more Centers in southeast Louisiana and Mississippi: Covington in 1998, Houma in 2008, Gonzales in 2009 and Natchez in 2019. In 2018, Mary Bird Perkins – Our Lady of the Lake Cancer Center and Woman's Hospital opened the Breast & GYN Cancer Pavilion and partnered with Lane Regional Medical Center in Zachary. Additionally, the Cancer Center partners with LSU Health Baton Rouge North Clinic.

From its inception, the mission of Mary Bird Perkins has been to provide the highest quality radiation therapy and compassionate support to all patients and their families. This commitment, created by the center's founders, has been supported year after year by the local community.

Today, Mary Bird Perkins is not only a leader in providing state-of-the-art radiation therapy across southeast Louisiana and the Natchez, MS area, but it is also bringing screenings and early detection programs, education and research to its service areas. Through multiple innovative partnerships, Mary Bird Perkins is succeeding in its mission to fight cancer.

Mary Bird Perkins was and still remains a community initiative. It is through support from the community and partner organizations that the organization will successfully meet future challenges of providing patients with state-of-the-art technology and comprehensive community cancer care.

The co-founders, Dr. M.J. Rathbone, Jr. and Anna B. Lipsey are recognized throughout the Essen Lane facility. The main waiting room is dedicated to Anna B. Lipsey.

References

External links 

Cancer hospitals
Hospitals in Louisiana
Hospitals established in 1971
1971 establishments in Louisiana
Baton Rouge, Louisiana
Buildings and structures in Baton Rouge, Louisiana